Morley is a First Nations settlement within the Stoney 142/143/144 Indian reserve in southern Alberta, Canada. It is located along the Canadian Pacific Railway between the Trans-Canada Highway and the Bow River, upstream from Ghost Lake. The settlement is located in census division No. 15 and in the federal riding of Wild Rose. The settlement and the Indian reserve are part of the Stoney Nation.

The historic McDougall Memorial United Church is located a few miles from Morley. Built in 1875, it was southern Alberta's oldest surviving Protestant church and the oldest remaining structure in the Bow Valley, it was damaged by fire on May 22, 2017 . Restoration is almost complete as of 2021. It was once a part of Morleyville, the oldest pioneer settlement in southern Alberta and home to its first herd of breeding cattle. Founded by the Methodist missionary George McDougall and his sons as a missionary outpost, Morleyville existed until 1921 when a new church was built in the present settlement of Morley, which had developed around the Morley Indian Agency building. The old church is now a provincial historic site. Other milestones in the settlement's history include the construction at Morley in 1920 of the first airport established by the Canada Air Board and the 1969 establishment of Canada's first magistrate's court to be held in a First Nations owned building on First Nations land.

History 
Settlement in the Morley area began with First Nations. The arrival of the Methodist missionary John McDougall and his wife in 1873 to establish a missionary outpost in the Bow Valley for outreach to the Nakoda (Stoney) and Siksika (Blackfoot) First Nations. They founded the mission at the request of John's father, George McDougall, the superintendent of Methodist missionary work in western Canada. The site John chose was originally called Ghost River, but he renamed it Morleyville in honour of his friend Morley Punshon, an Ontario doctor.

John McDougall and his wife began their work by constructing a two-room log shack with a sod roof for themselves and a small church. Shortly thereafter, the McDougalls moved their fledgling outpost to a new site to the south, closer to the river. In 1875, they built a larger church with the help of George McDougall and Andrew Sibbald, a carpenter and teacher. Logs and boards laboriously fashioned from local timber with a whipsaw were used to build the one room church. Aside from the framed gable ends, the exterior surface of the log walls remained unfinished, but the interior surfaces were daubed with mud and painted white, except for the paneled end walls. Around 1900, the log walls were covered with board-and-batten siding and a steeple was built. It is southern Alberta's oldest remaining Protestant church, the oldest remaining structure in the Bow Valley, and is the province's earliest example of a building constructed in the carpenter gothic style still standing at the place of its original construction.

David McDougall later joined his brother John at Morleyville and helped to found the Indian Trading Post. In its early days, some seven hundred First Nations people visited the post to barter animal skins for food, blankets, stockings, and prints. The homes and the trading post were enclosed by a stockade of heavy logs erected to provide defense in case a party of First Nations warriors attempted a raid. The outpost became a hub for settlers coming into the Bow Valley and reached a population of over two hundred at its peak; Morleyville was southern Alberta's first pioneer settlement. A school and orphanage were built, along with missionary residences, barns and corrals. Southern Alberta's first herd of breeding cattle supplied Morleyville's residents with meat and milk. Sibbald, one of Alberta's first trained teachers, taught at the school.

An Indian residential school operated by the Methodists was located in Morley from 1886 until 1949. A school textbook was published for teaching English to the students residing there. This textbook makes reference to Morley and McDougall.

Morleyville's early prominence declined in the 1880s after the Canadian Pacific transcontinental railroad bypassed the settlement as it was routed through the valley on the opposite side of the Bow River. John McDougall and his wife remained there until their retirement to Calgary in 1898. The church remained in use until 1921 when it was replaced by a new church located a few miles away at a First Nations settlement that developed around an Indian Agency building. This newer settlement is the present-day Morley. The old settlement and its church stood abandoned until volunteers affiliated with the United Church of Canada formed the Morley Church Restoration Society. Work was completed in 1952 and the restored church continues to be used for weddings and special occasions. The building has been declared a provincial historic site and is listed in the Canadian Register of Historic Places; a historical marker at the site describes its significance. The McDougall Stoney Mission Society currently maintains the church and the surrounding fifty acres of ecologically significant native prairie that has never been disturbed by agricultural activities.

The first airport and test station to be established by the Canada Air Board began operation at Morley in 1920. Known as the Morley Air Station, it was equipped with six Airco DH.9A aircraft used for aerial reconnaissance of Banff National Park, forestry ranging in the Rocky Mountain Foothills, and aerial firefighting.

In 1969, Morley hosted the first magistrate's court in Canada to be held in a First Nations owned building located on First Nations land.

Notable people 
John W. Niddrie, early pioneer and religious leader

See also 
George McDougall
List of communities in Alberta

References

External links 
McDougall Stoney Mission Society

Localities on Indian reserves in Alberta